
The Lotus 340R is a limited edition sports car manufactured by Lotus Cars in 2000 at their Hethel factory.

Overview
Originally introduced as a concept car at the 1998 Birmingham Motor Show, the 340R is a special edition of the Lotus Elise. 340 were built, and all were sold before they were manufactured. It uses a custom built bodyshell with no roof or doors. All cars came with a silver and black colour scheme. Special A038R tyres were developed for the 340R in collaboration with Yokohama.

While road-legal in the UK and Europe, most of the surviving cars are only used for racing, track use, or demonstrations.

Engine

Specifications

0- 10.7 sec
Power-to-weight ratio: /Ton or /bhp
Price: £35,000

References

External links

Independent 340R site
PistonHeads Entry
The Lotus 340R story

340R
Rear mid-engine, rear-wheel-drive vehicles
Sports cars
Cars introduced in 2000